The following highways are numbered 860:

Canada

United States